The Barn on Lot 8, Range G is a historic barn in rural Franklin County, Maine.  The barn was built in two stages, the first estimated to be around 1825, the second in 1899.  It exhibits an architecturally distinctive solution to issues surrounding the expansion of a traditional English barn.  The barn was listed on the National Register of Historic Places in 2011.

Setting
The property on which the barn stands has uncertain ownership prior to 1825, and has always been referred to in property records as Lot 8, Range G.  The barn stands behind a 1-1/2 story wood frame Cape style house which also appears to date to the first half of the 19th century, whose historical integrity has been compromised by alterations including the application of modern siding. The buildings are surrounded by several acres of fields and former orchard, beyond which lie woods.

Description
It is oriented east-west, perpendicular to the road. A second, hinged doorway is in the western gable in the new section. There are two pedestrian entrances on the east face, and there is irregular fenestration on the east, south, and west faces. The exterior of the walls is clad in vertical sheathing which is probably a 20th-century replacement. The barn's roof is steel.

The interior of the barn clearly shows the two sections of the barn.  The older portion is built using hand-hewn timbers and scribe-rule joinery, while the newer portion uses sawn timbers and square-rule joinery.  It is basically oriented with a north-south aisle separating three bays on either side.  The central bay on the west side has been adapted to serve as a passage into the new portion, whose bays run east-to-west.  In order to accommodate this addition. two of the older barn's main supports were relocated to either side of this new passage.  This type of alteration had, as of this barn's National Register nomination in 2011, not been seen elsewhere in Maine.  A more typical process of expanding an English barn in rural New England was to simply build a second English barn and attach it to the first, but this resulted in two separate aisles.  A second common method was to reorient the old barn's doors to the gable ends, reorienting all of the central posts to accommodate the new central aisle.  In this barn, only one side was altered, creating an internal T-shaped aisle layout.

See also
National Register of Historic Places listings in Franklin County, Maine

References

Buildings and structures in Franklin County, Maine
Barns on the National Register of Historic Places in Maine
Barns in Maine
National Register of Historic Places in Franklin County, Maine